Anatoly Mikhailovich Shchukin (7 December 1916 – 29 May 1983) was a Soviet stage and voice actor. After graduating from a stage school of Boris Shchukin, between 1938 and 1941 he worked at the Vakhtangov Theatre. During World War II he performed with the Soviet Navy Theatre, and in 1946–1948 with the Mossovet Theatre. He spent the rest of his career at the Central Youth Theatre in Moscow, occasionally providing his voice for animations, such as the award-winning Winnie-the-Pooh Pays a Visit. In 1976 he was made an Honored Artist of Russia.

Selected filmography
The Wild Swans (film) (1962)
 Winnie-the-Pooh Pays a Visit (1971)

References

External links

1916 births
1983 deaths
Soviet male stage actors
Soviet male voice actors